The Hockey Association of Malawi (HAM) is the governing body of field hockey in Malawi. Its headquarters are in  Limbe, Malawi. It is affiliated to IHF International Hockey Federation and AHF African Hockey Federation.

Torchalan Tochi Gill is the president of Hockey Association of Malawi, and Dr Lameck Fiwa is the general secretary.

History

See also
 African Hockey Federation

References

External links
 Sports Malawi-Hockey

Malawi
Hockey